The Manila International Airport Authority (MIAA) is a government-owned and controlled corporation and agency under the Department of Transportation of the Philippines responsible for the management of Ninoy Aquino International Airport (NAIA) formerly Manila International Airport. MIAA was created by virtue of Executive Order No. 778 signed in 1982 by President Ferdinand Marcos.

On October 10, 2018, MIAA has achieved another milestone after obtaining its ISO certification under ISO 2001:2015 standards. The authority began its certification journey in 2008 when it first obtained its ISO certification under ISO 9001:2008 standards.

Ranks for official personnel

Airport Police Senior Superintendent
Airport Police  Superintendent
Airport Police Chief Inspector
Airport Police Senior Inspector
Airport Police Inspector

Ranks for non-official personnel
Airport Police Officer III
Airport Police Officer II
Airport Police Officer I

See also

Ninoy Aquino International Airport
Civil Aviation Authority of the Philippines
Department of Transportation

References

External links
Official website of the Manila International Airport Authority

Department of Transportation (Philippines)
Government-owned and controlled corporations of the Philippines
Ninoy Aquino International Airport
Transportation in Metro Manila
Establishments by Philippine executive order